is a 1954 black-and-white Japanese film directed by Tsuruo Iwama.

Cast
 Hibari Misora

References

Japanese black-and-white films
1954 films
1950s Japanese films